Asperolaelaps is a genus of mites in the family Ameroseiidae. There are at least two described species in Asperolaelaps.

Species
These two species belong to the genus Asperolaelaps:
 Asperolaelaps rotundus Womersley, 1956
 Asperolaelaps sextuberculi (Karg, 1996)

References

Acari